Alexander James Jackson (born December 25, 1995) is an American professional baseball catcher and outfielder in the Milwaukee Brewers organization. He previously played for the Atlanta Braves and Miami Marlins. He was drafted by the Seattle Mariners in the first round of the 2014 MLB draft, and made his MLB debut in 2019 with the Braves.

Amateur career
Jackson attended Rancho Bernardo High School in San Diego County, California. In 2012 and 2013, he played in the Under Armour All-America Baseball Game at Wrigley Field. As a junior, Jackson was ranked by MaxPreps as the best high school prospect for the 2014 class and was their Junior of the Year. Jackson verbally committed to the University of Oregon in March 2013. As a senior, he tied John Drennen for most career home runs in the San Diego section with 47. After the season, he won Baseball Americas High School Player of the Year Award.

Professional career

Seattle Mariners
Jackson was highly touted as the best hitter in the 2014 Major League Baseball draft. The Seattle Mariners selected him in the first round, with the sixth overall pick. He signed with the Mariners on June 23.

After signing, Jackson spent his first professional season with the AZL Mariners, slashing .280/.344/.476 with two home runs, 16 RBIs, and six doubles in 23 games. He began the 2015 season with the Clinton LumberKings, where he struggled, batting .157 with no home runs and 35 strikeouts in 28 games. The Mariners returned Jackson to extended spring training in May, and reassigned him to the Everett AquaSox when their season began in June. He spent the remainder of 2015 with Everett, batting .239 with eight home runs and 25 RBIs in 48 games. Jackson spent 2016 with Clinton where he batted .243 with 11 home runs and 55 RBIs in 92 games.

Atlanta Braves
On November 28, 2016, the Mariners traded Jackson and Tyler Pike to the Atlanta Braves for Rob Whalen and Max Povse. Jackson began the 2017 season with the Florida Fire Frogs, and later that season, was promoted to the Mississippi Braves. He hit .267/.328/.480 with 19 home runs and 65 RBIs in 96 games between the two clubs.

The Braves added Jackson to their 40-man roster after the 2018 season. They promoted him to the major leagues on April 7, 2019, and he made his major league debut that afternoon. In 2020 for Atlanta, Jackson only received seven at bats, but recorded his first two major league hits.

On June 24, 2021, Jackson was placed on the 60-day injured list with a strained left hamstring. Jackson was reinstated from the injured list on July 21.

Miami Marlins
On July 30, 2021, Jackson was traded to the Miami Marlins in exchange for Adam Duvall.

Milwaukee Brewers
On April 6, 2022, Jackson was traded to the Milwaukee Brewers in exchange for Hayden Cantrelle and Alexis Ramirez. On December 2, 2022, he was sent outright off the 40-man roster.

References

External links

1995 births
Living people
Sportspeople from Escondido, California
Baseball players from California
Major League Baseball catchers
Atlanta Braves players
Miami Marlins players
Milwaukee Brewers players
Arizona League Mariners players
Clinton LumberKings players
Everett AquaSox players
Florida Fire Frogs players
Peoria Javelinas players
Mississippi Braves players
Gwinnett Stripers players
Rancho Bernardo High School alumni
Jacksonville Jumbo Shrimp players
Nashville Sounds players
Arizona Complex League Brewers players